This page lists the World Best Year Performance in the year 1990 in both the men's and the women's race walking distances: 10 km, 20 km and 50 km (outdoor).

Abbreviations
All times shown are in hours:minutes:seconds

Men's 20 km

Records

1990 World Year Ranking

Men's 50 km

Records

1990 World Year Ranking

Women's 5 km

Records

1990 World Year Ranking

Women's 10 km

Records

1990 World Year Ranking

References
maik-richter
alltime-athletics
gbrathletics (men)
gbrathletics (women)

1990
Race Walking Year Ranking, 1990